The third neighbor policy is a facet of foreign relations of Mongolia referring to its building relationships with countries other than Russia and China, the two superpowers that historically had a sphere of influence extending to the country. The economy of Mongolia is dependent on exploitation of the country's mineral resources, which include copper, gold, uranium and coal, and thus the country is vulnerable to pressure from foreign countries and corporations involved in resource extraction.

Examples
In mid-March 2018, president Khaltmaagiin Battulga appealed to U.S. President Donald Trump via telegram to more trade relations, saying an economic downturn threatened to destabilize Mongolia, and that although Mongolia is an "oasis of democracy", this "does not contribute to economic development" in a region where authoritarianism (China and Russia) in on the rise. The United States is one of Mongolia's Third Neighbors, which Battulga said that U.S. trade and investment could help prevent the return of authoritarian in Mongolia.

See also
Mongolia–Russia relations
China – Mongolia relations

References

Foreign relations of Mongolia
Military of Mongolia
Economy of Mongolia